Bernat Sanahuja (born 21 October 2000) is a Spanish water polo player. He competed in the 2020 Summer Olympics.

References

2000 births
Living people
Sportspeople from Terrassa
Water polo players at the 2020 Summer Olympics
Spanish male water polo players
Olympic water polo players of Spain
World Aquatics Championships medalists in water polo